The Samuel Gompers-class destroyer tenders were a class of ships that served the United States Navy from 1967 to 1996.

History
The Samuel Gompers-class was the first class of destroyer tenders designed by the U.S. Navy, twenty years after the preceding Shenandoah-class. The ships were specifically designed to be able to service ships with nuclear propulsion or with gas turbines. The ships were also able to service the variety of guided missiles coming into service. They also had a helicopter platform aft, although only  was later fitted with a hangar, when she served as flagship of the United States Sixth Fleet. Both ships were originally armed with a World War II-vintage 5"/38 caliber gun turret forward. The construction of two additional ships (AD-39, AD-40) was cancelled in 1969 and 1974.

Ships in class

References

 
Auxiliary ship classes of the United States Navy
Auxiliary depot ship classes